National Highway 317 (NH 317) is a  National Highway in India. This highway runs entirely in the state of West Bengal. It is a secondary route of National Highway 17. This route was earlier part of old national highway 31C. Birpara to Hasimara stretch of this national highway is part of Asian Highway 48.

Route
NH317 connects Birpara, Madari Hat, Hasimara, Rajabaht Khawa and Salsabari in the state of West Bengal.

Junctions  

  Terminal near Birpara.
  near Hasimara
  Terminal near Salsabari.

See also
 List of National Highways in India
 List of National Highways in India by state

References

External links
 NH 317 on OpenStreetMap

National highways in India
National Highways in West Bengal